Waikiki is a neighborhood and beach in Honolulu, Oahu, Hawaii. 

Waikiki may also refer to:

 Waikiki Beach, a famous beach in Caparica coast, Portugal
 Waikiki, Western Australia, a suburb of Perth
 Waikiki (band), a rock group from Sydney, Australia
 Waikiki (film), a 1980 American television film 
 The Waikikis, a Belgian studio band
 Waikiki Theatre, a now demolished theatre in Honolulu, Hawaii
 Waikiki Beech, a single-engine aircraft
 Waikiki beach cocktail, a rum-based Hawaiian cocktail
 Waikiki Beach, a beach in Cape Disappointment, Washington
 LC Waikiki, a Turkish clothing company
 Welcome to Waikiki, a 2018 youth South Korean television series 
 Welcome to Waikiki 2, a 2019 youth South Korean television series 
 Waikiki Flow, a 2019 song by Shy Glizzy